Andrey Anatolyevich Anikeyev (born 16 December 1961, Moscow, Russian Soviet Federative Socialist Republic) is a Russian political figure, deputy of the 8th State Duma convocation. In the 1990s he moved to Orenburg where he headed the Open Joint Stock Company "ORENTEKS" that specializes on the textile industry. In 2005 he was awarded a Candidate of Economics Sciences degree from the Moscow Academy of the Labor Market and Information Technology. From 2000 to 2002 he was a deputy of the Orenburg City Council and later became a deputy of the Orenburg Legislative Assembly of the 3rd (2002-2006) and 6th (2016-2021) convocations. In 2021, he entered the list of the wealthiest deputies in the Legislative Assembly. In September 2021 he was elected to the State Duma of 8th convocation where he represents the Orenburg Oblast. He ran with the United Russia. 

Andrey Anikeyev is a Master of Sports in athletics and a repeated champion of Moscow and All-Union competitions.

References

1961 births
Living people
Politicians from Moscow
United Russia politicians
21st-century Russian politicians
Eighth convocation members of the State Duma (Russian Federation)